Zahari Emilov Baharov (born August 12, 1980) is a Bulgarian actor, best known for portraying the roles of Moth in Zift (2008), Ivo Andonov in the BNT series Undercover (2011–2016), and Loboda in the HBO series Game of Thrones (2015).

Early life and education 
Baharov was born on 12 August 1980 in Sofia. He was raised in the old part of the Ovcha Kupel district. His mother, Müjgan, is of ethnic Turkish origin; she is a philologist and hosts programmes in Turkish on the Bulgarian National Radio. 

Baharov attended 18th Secondary School "William Gladstone". After graduating, he majored in acting at the National Academy for Theatre and Film Arts. He has been acting at the Ivan Vazov National Theatre since 2003; his notable theater performances include King Lear (2006), Don Juan (2007), and The Cherry Orchard (2009).

Career 
Baharov's first major film role was in Zift (2008), directed by Javor Gardev. After the release of Zift, he quickly gained popularity and won several awards for his performance. In 2011, he starred in Love.net. The following year, he founded the production company Three Bears Entertainment alongside his colleagues and friends Vladimir Karamazov and Yulian Vergov. The company has produced three theatrical productions: Spinach with potatoes by Zoltan Egresi, Art by Yasmina Reza and Dakota by Jordi Galceran.

From 2011 to 2016, Baharov starred in the BNT 1 series Undercover as Ivo Andonov. His performance was positively received by critics, and his character's development was noted as one of the series' highlights. Between 2012 and 2020, he was the host of the television game show National Lottery on Nova. In 2015, Baharov had a one-episode role in the HBO series Game of Thrones, portraying the role of Loboda, the leader of a cannibal tribe.

Personal life
Baharov is in a long-term relationship with Bulgarian journalist Diana Alexieva. They have two children: a son, Maxim (born 2010), and a daughter, Kaya (born 2013).

Baharov's younger brother, Yavor, is also an actor.

Awards 
Baharov is the recipient of several accolades, including two Askeers for Best Supporting Actor in King Lear (2006) and Three Days of Rain (2009), an Icarus for Best Supporting Actor in Don Juan (2007), Best Actor at the 2009 Bulgarian Cinema Awards and Best Actor at the 2009 International Film Festival Chungmuro, among more.

Filmography

Film

Television

Theater

References

External links
 
 Three Bears Entertainment official site

1980 births
Living people
Bulgarian people of Turkish descent
Male actors from Sofia
Bulgarian male film actors
21st-century Bulgarian male actors
Bulgarian male television actors